ZX Spectrum Next is an 8-bit home computer, initially released in 2017, which is compatible with software and hardware for the 1982 ZX Spectrum. It also has enhanced capabilities. It is intended to appeal to retrocomputing enthusiasts and to "encourage a new generation of bedroom coders", according to project member Jim Bagley.

Despite the name, the machine is not directly affiliated with Sinclair Research Ltd., Sir Clive Sinclair or the current owner of the trademarks, Sky Group.

History 
The Next started life in 2010 in Brazil, as a variant of the TK95 Spectrum clone. In 2016, Victor Trucco and Fabio Belavenuto announced the "TBBlue" firmware, named after the two creators and the colour of the solder mask of the motherboard, a bare circuit board implementation of the product for advanced hobbyists.

With the help of Henrique Olifiers the duo wanted to export the TBBlue to the UK, the ZX Spectrum's original home, having received moderate success with the board in Brazil.

The Next was first announced as a distinct product in 2016 after the participation of original Spectrum industrial designer Rick Dickinson was secured. A crowdfunding campaign was launched on the Kickstarter platform in January 2017 with an initial funding goal of £250,000. At the end of the campaign 3,113 backers pledged £723,390. While the campaign was successful in creating a userbase for the new platform, it wasn't a commercial success. Due to what campaign creators call "bad tax advice" the production of the machines ended up causing costs instead of revenue to the creators.

Although initially intended to use the original ZX Spectrum's Z80 chip, the design was altered to use the Xilinx Spartan-6 FPGA, to allow "hardware sprites, scrolling, and other advanced features to be incorporated within the machine itself".

The board-only computer was delivered to backers in December 2017. After some design and production delays, the first batch of finished units were delivered to backers in March 2020.

A second Kickstarter launched on 11 August 2020 at 21:00 BST and reached 100% funding (£250,000) within minutes. The campaign closed on 10 September 2020 with £1,847,106 (738% funding)

Industrial design 
The Next's case design is by Rick Dickinson who designed the original 48K Spectrum and Spectrum+, but passed away during the development of the keyboard of the computer. It takes design cues from the Spectrum+ and Spectrum 128, not the later Spectrum +2 or +3 manufactured by Amstrad.

Reception 
The Next has received generally favorable reviews in the specialist press. In the official Raspberry Pi magazine "MagPi", Lucy Hattersley called it "a lovely piece of kit", noting that it is "well-designed and well-built: authentic to the original, and with technology that nods to the past while remaining functional and relevant in the modern age".

In PC Pro magazine, columnist Gareth Halfacree called the Next "undeniably impressive" while noting that the printed manual lacks an index, and that some features are "not quite ready".

Retro Gamer featured an 8-page interview with the creators of the machine about the highs and lows of creating a "true successor to the much-loved Sinclair micro".

Models 
Revisions of the Next's motherboard's design are referred to as "Issues", in keeping with the original ZX Spectrum, and have been made to either improve quality or in response to problems with the supply of components. Care has been taken to not change the core capabilities, compatibility, and specifications of all models of the Next between Issues.

First Kickstarter 

Four models of the Next were produced in the first Kickstarter using the Xilinx Spartan-6 FPGA.

All models include 1024 KiB RAM (768 KiB free) and can be upgraded by the owner;
 Adding two 512 KiB chips brings the RAM to 2048 KiB (1792 KiB free).
 An internal "beeper" speaker can be installed.
 Any of the higher models' optional extras can be installed.

Second Kickstarter 

Two models of the Next were offered in the second Kickstarter using the Xilinx Artix-7 FPGA.

Both models are cased, include a real-time clock, Wi-Fi, and 2048 KiB RAM (1792 KiB free), use board Issue 4, and can be upgraded by the owner;
 An internal "beeper" speaker can be installed.
 A Raspberry Pi Zero unit can be installed as an "Accelerator" into the Next Plus.

Operating system and software 
The default operating system of the Next is NextZXOS. The operating system provides a graphical file browser and menu based access to Next's features. In addition the machine has an extended BASIC interpreter NextBASIC, with commands and features added to support the new capabilities, such as support for 9-channel AY-sound and built-in sprite graphics editor.

NextZXOS and NextBASIC were written by Garry Lancaster, and the machine is provided with printed manual covering the OS and BASIC in detail. The first edition of the manual can be downloaded from the official website.

In addition to the native OS, the Next is able to run prior versions of Sinclair BASIC, such as 48K BASIC and 128K BASIC. The Next is also able to run CP/M. For licensing reasons, CP/M doesn't come bundled with the machine, but has to be downloaded separately. Although this does potentially open a sizeable software library of CP/M to the Next users, it is worth noting that CP/M cannot take advantage of the machine's advanced capabilities, such as large memory.

Some 3rd party "Next only" software has sprung into existence despite the comparatively short time that the machine has been on the market. These include the likes of NxTel by Robin Verhagen-Guest (a Teletext-style Next specific webservice accessible via Wi-Fi), and NextDAW by Gari Biasillo (a digital audio workstation software capable of utilizing the Next's sound capabilities for creating Chiptunes). NxTel comes bundled with the machine on the accompanying SD-Card.

Some of the original ZX Spectrum games have also been upgraded or are being upgraded to utilize Next's improved graphics and sound. Among the most notable remakes are Atic Atac with improved graphics by Craig Stevenson. The new game version is backed by the current owner of the rights Rare studio and the Next port is written by Kev Brady.

Licensing 
The NextZXOS and NextBASIC are both released under Open/Closed-Source hybrid license called "The Next License", with all parts of the OS being closed source by default, unless explicitly placed under Open Source MIT License. The Next License prohibits selling the software and charging a duplication fee for it, but cost-free distribution is allowed under the CreativeCommons Attribution-ShareAlike license. The OS and BASIC are publicly hosted on GitLab.

Hardware is released under a "mixed source" proprietary license.
The VHDL/Verilog for the FPGA digital design is available on GitLab and licensed under GPL3.
Everything else is closed including the Schematics, the PCB master files and keyboard/case 3D model.

Personalities and alternative FPGA cores 
The Next is able to reproduce the behaviour of any prior Sinclair ZX80, ZX81 or Spectrum machine, as well as some notable ZX Spectrum clones (both official and unlicensed) through a feature called "Personalities". Examples of such clone personalities are Timex Sinclair TC2048 and the russian Pentagon machines. Personalities can match hardware features, timings, memory, graphics and sound capabilities and OS version with the machines to be reproduced in an effort to provide full compatibility with them. The default personality of the Next is based on Sinclair ZX Spectrum +3e. It is also possible for the user to configure and add new personalities as needed.

The Next can also be used to recreate a number of other, non-Spectrum based computers, such as the Acorn BBC Micro, as long as their hardware will "fit" into the FPGA. These recreations are known as "cores". The machine can also be made to boot directly into an alternative core. While the use of alternate cores is supported, the cores themselves are unofficial third-party projects. A Sinclair QL core is described as "very stable, [ booting ] every time".

Clones and emulators 

The Next team actively encourages the manufacture of clone machines to promote and expand the userbase as much as possible.

Clones of the Next include:

Xilinx FPGA based-clones
 ZXDOS+ (board) / gomaDOS+ (board with case)
 A ZX Next/TBBlue Clone
 N-GO, which can be installed into a (modified) ZX Spectrum case in the same way as the Next Issue 2A

Altera FPGA-based clones
 UnAmiga (board with case)

 UnAmiga Reloaded (board with case)
 Multicore 2 / Multicore 2+ (board with case)
 NeptUNO (board with case)
 MiST (Core with TZX loading and RTC support)
 Sidi (Low cost MiST derivative)
 Mister (Core with special dual SDRAM/SRAM memory addon)
 MiSTer an Intel Cyclone V based board with 1 GB DDR3 and hundred opensource retro cores 

Emulators of the Next include:
 ZEsarUX by Cesar Hernandez
 #CSpect by Mike Dailly

References

External links
 Official website
 Kickstarter campaigns;
 First (board Issues 2A and 2B, from 23 April 2017 to 23 May 2017)
 Second (board Issue 4, from 11 August 2020 to 10 September 2020)
 FPGA cores;
 Open-source FPGA firmware
 GitLab repository Victor Trucco: ZX Spectrum Next Cores

 
Computers designed in the United Kingdom
Computer-related introductions in 2017
Home computers
Sinclair Research
Z80-based home computers
Kickstarter-funded products